Mantua is the English form of the name of the city (and, historically, also an eponymous margraviate and thereafter duchy) in Italy whose Italian name is Mantova.

Mantua may also refer to:

Places

United States
 Mantua, Alabama, a hamlet in Greene County, Alabama
 Mantua, a location in Monroe County, Iowa
 Mantua, a village in Baltimore County, Maryland
 Mantua Township, New Jersey, in Gloucester County
 Mantua Creek, a stream in the above township
 Mantua Township, Portage County, Ohio, a township in Ohio adjacent to Mantua, Ohio
 Mantua, Ohio, a village in Portage County adjacent to Mantua Township, Portage County, Ohio
 Mantua, Philadelphia, Pennsylvania, a neighborhood in the West Philadelphia section
 Mantua, Utah, a town in eastern Box Elder County
 Mantua, Virginia, a census-designated place in Fairfax County

Elsewhere
 Mantua, Cuba, a municipality and city in the Pinar del Río Province
 Mantua, Nova Scotia, an unincorporated community in West Hants, Nova Scotia, Canada

Other uses
 Mantua (clothing), a style of women's dress of the seventeenth and eighteenth centuries
 Mantua (Kimberley Hall), a 17th-century complete European women's costume
 Mantua (moth), a genus of moths in the family Tortricidae